The Suswa Geothermal Power Station also known as Suswa Geothermal Power Plant is  a planned geothermal power plant in Kenya, with installed electric generating capacity of

Location

Overview
CYRQ Energy, a United States-based energy and technology company, has carried out feasibility studies for a geothermal power station at the project site. The results of those studies support the development of an economically viable power station, with capacity of 330 megawatts.

The power station, to be developed in phases, will start with capacity of 75 megawatts. subsequent phases will raise output to 330 megawatts. The energy from this power station is expected to be sold to Kenya Power and Lighting Company, under a 25 year power purchase agreement.

Timetable and funding
As of October 2018, the station owner/developers have submitted requests to install the power station at the development site. When those requests are approved, construction of the first phase is expected to follow and take an estimated three to four years. Later phases of the development would then follow. The entire development is estimated to cost KSh30 billion (US$300 million), financed through equity and debt.

Ownership
The power station is owned by the company that is developing it; CYRQ Energy, headquartered in Salt Lake City, Utah.

See also

List of power stations in Kenya
Geothermal power in Kenya

References

External links
Website of Cyrq Energy Inc.

Geothermal power stations in Kenya
Narok County
Proposed geothermal power stations
Proposed renewable energy power stations in Kenya